Fernando Frye (born March 6, 1997) is an American football guard and center who is a free agent. He played college football at East Carolina.

College career
Frye originally played for Mercyhurst University spending two years with the program where he spent the 2015 and 2016 seasons before joining East Carolina as a walk-on transfer. After spending his first year on campus as a scout team member, he worked his way into the starting lineup in 2018 season.

Frye entered his name for the 2022 NFL Draft after finishing his final season at East Carolina. He would go on to be undrafted.

Professional career
On November 16, 2022, during the 2023 XFL Draft Frye was selected as the 84th pick of the 11th round by the Vegas Vipers.

Personal life
Frye attended McDowell High School in Millcreek Township, Pennsylvania. During his time at East Carolina University he majored in criminal justice.

He is the son of Jendi Frye and has two siblings Dylan and Kylie.

References

External links
East Carolina Pirates bio

1997 births
Living people
Mercyhurst Lakers football players
East Carolina Pirates football players
Players of American football from Pennsylvania
Sportspeople from Erie, Pennsylvania
Vegas Vipers players